Akiéni Airport is an airport serving the town of Akiéni in Haut-Ogooué Province, Gabon.

See also

 List of airports in Gabon
 Transport in Gabon

References

Airports in Gabon